Urgench International Airport  is an airport in Urgench, Uzbekistan.

Airlines and destinations

See also
List of the busiest airports in the former USSR
Transportation in Uzbekistan

References

External links
 
 

Airports in Uzbekistan
Xorazm Region